Berthellina is a genus of sea slugs, marine gastropod molluscs in the family Pleurobranchidae.

Species
Species within the genus Berthellina are:
 Berthellina barquini Ortea, 2014
 Berthellina circularis (Mörch, 1863)
 Berthellina citrina (Rüppell & Leuckart, 1828)
 Berthellina cuvieri (Bergh, 1898)
 Berthellina delicata (Pease, 1861)
 Berthellina edwardsii (Vayssière, 1897)
 Berthellina granulata (Krauss, 1848) – lemon pleurobranch
 Berthellina ignis Alvim & Pimenta, 2015
 Berthellina ilisima Marcus & Marcus, 1967
 Berthellina magma Ortea, 2014
 Berthellina minor (Bergh, 1905)
 Berthellina oblonga (Audouin, 1826)
 Berthellina quadridens (Mörch, 1863)
 Berthellina utris Ortea, Moro & Caballer, 2014

Species inquirenda
 Berthellina engeli Gardiner, 1936 - (taxon inquirendum)

References

Further reading
 Howson, C.M.; Picton, B.E. (Ed.) (1997). The species directory of the marine fauna and flora of the British Isles and surrounding seas. Ulster Museum Publication, 276. The Ulster Museum: Belfast, UK. . vi, 508 (+ cd-rom)
 Gofas, S.; Le Renard, J.; Bouchet, P. (2001). Mollusca, in: Costello, M.J. et al. (Ed.) (2001). European register of marine species: a check-list of the marine species in Europe and a bibliography of guides to their identification. Collection Patrimoines Naturels, 50: pp. 180–213

External links
 Sea Slug Forum info

Pleurobranchidae
Gastropod genera